Eschscholzia rhombipetala, the diamond-petaled California poppy, is endemic to California.

It a relative of the California poppy, with diminutive flowers.

Once thought extinct, it was rediscovered in the 1990s in the northern Carrizo Plain of the Southern Interior California Coast Ranges in San Luis Obispo County; and in a location at the Lawrence Livermore National Laboratory in Alameda County in the East San Francisco Bay Area.

References

External links
CalFlora Database: Eschscholzia rhombipetala (diamond petaled California poppy,  diamondpetal California poppy)
Jepson Manual eFlora (TJM2) treatment of Eschscholzia rhombipetala
{http://calphotos.berkeley.edu/cgi-bin/img_query?where-taxon=Eschscholzia+rhombipetala&where-anno=1 UC Photos gallery — Eschscholzia rhombipetala]

rhombipetala
Endemic flora of California
Natural history of the California chaparral and woodlands
Natural history of the Channel Islands of California
Natural history of San Luis Obispo County, California
Endemic flora of the San Francisco Bay Area